The Glegghorn is a mountain of the Rätikon (Swiss Alps), overlooking Maienfeld in the canton of Graubünden. It lies just south of the Falknis, where runs the border with Liechtenstein.

References

External links
 Glegghorn on Hikr

Mountains of the Alps
Mountains of Switzerland
Mountains of Graubünden
Two-thousanders of Switzerland
Maienfeld